Guaymallén is a  central department of Mendoza Province in Argentina.

History

1858, on May 14 Guaymallén Department was created.
1896, on May 19 Villa Nueva was declared as cabecera (capital) of the departament.

Economy

The economy of the Guaymallén Department, represented 8.7% of the economy of Mendoza Province.

The three main sectors of the economy are banks and financial institutions, the service sector, and industry and manufacturing.

Districts

Guaymallén Department is divided into 20 districts:

Belgrano
Bermejo
Buena Nueva
Capilla del Rosario
Colonia Segovia
Dorrego
El Sauce
Jesús Nazareno
Kilómetro 8
Kilómetro 11
La Primavera
Las Cañas
Los Corralitos
Nueva Ciudad
Pedro Molina
Puente de Hierro
Rodeo de la Cruz
San Francisco del Monte
San José
Villa Nueva

External links
Information about Guaymallén (Spanish)
Municipal site (Spanish)
Satellite Image of Villa Nueva
Index of streets and barrios of Guaymallén

1858 establishments in Argentina
Departments of Mendoza Province